The James V. Brown Library is a public library in Williamsport, in Lycoming County, Pennsylvania and the headquarters of the Lycoming County Library System and the North Central Library District. The main building formally opened to the public in 1907.

History 

When James V. Brown died in 1904, he left a plot of land and $150,000 for the creation of a public library. This included $10,000 for the purchase of books and an endowment of $10,000 per year for other library-related purposes. The cornerstone was laid on 10 March 1906, and the library opened on 17 June 1907 with an initial holding of approximately 12,000 volumes (1,300 were in the reference room, 1,600 in the children's room and 600 in the Pennsylvania room). By noon of the first day, 150 books had been checked out.

The building was designed by Edgar V. Sealer of Philadelphia in imitation of French Renaissance architecture, and is built of white Pennsylvania marble. The entrance door is flanked by double columns; over it is a bust of the donor.

This new wing, the Kathryn Siegel Welch Children's Wing, was completed in 2009 at a cost $6.5 million, of which $2 million came from a state grant.

The library operates two traveling library vehicles, the Bookmobile, and the Storymobile.

Recognition 

The library has received many "Best Practices in Early Learning" awards from the Pennsylvania Library Association for its early childhood programs.

References 

Buildings and structures in Williamsport, Pennsylvania
Libraries in Pennsylvania
1907 establishments in Pennsylvania
Libraries established in 1907